Chiffon margarine was first manufactured in 1954 by Anderson, Clayton and Company, a cotton products firm of Houston, Texas. Chiffon was one of the first soft, tub-style margarine products. It was originally available in "regular", "sweet", and "unsalted" forms.

Background and history
Anderson, Clayton and Company was founded in early 1905 by brothers-in-law Monroe Dunaway Anderson and William L. Clayton. Originally based in Oklahoma City, the firm moved its headquarters to Houston, Texas, in 1916. There, it grew to be the world's largest cotton-trading enterprise.  In 1952, the company had created a food division to research and find uses for hydrogenated cottonseed oil. The development of Chiffon margarine was one result.

The Chiffon name and product line has changed hands several times since; the first being in 1985, when Chiffon was sold to Kraft Foods. The Kraft U.S. and Canada tablespreads division subsequently became part of Nabisco in 1995; who then sold the brand to ConAgra Foods in 1998. Con-Agra discontinued domestic U.S. and Canadian distribution of Chiffon margarine in 2002. Chiffon margarine can still be purchased in the Caribbean region, however, where it is marketed by Seprod Ltd. Rights to Chiffon trademark are now held by Seprod.

Marketing
The classic Chiffon ads from the D'Arcy Masius Benton & Bowles advertising agency ran during the 1970s and into the 1980s, featuring character actress Dena Dietrich as the iconic character Mother Nature. She likes Chiffon and identifies it as "my delicious butter!" The narrator (voiced by character actor Mason Adams) then tells her: "That's Chiffon margarine, not butter ... Chiffon's so delicious it fooled even you, Mother Nature." Vexed at the trickery, Mother Nature responds by uttering, in increasingly scornful tones, her signature line "It's not nice to fool Mother Nature", quickly followed by a flash of lightning, a peal of thunder, and occasionally an additional threat (such as silently commanding an elephant to charge the camera). The advertisements were typically closed by a jingle containing the lyrics, "If you think it's butter, but it's not: it's Chiffon."

See also

 List of American advertising characters

References and notes

External links 
 Duke University archives; Chiffon ad
 It's not nice to fool Mother Nature TV commercial

Margarine brands
Products introduced in 1954
Companies based in Texas
Food manufacturers of the United States
Kraft Foods brands
Conagra Brands brands